Fluviatispora is a genus of fungi in the Halosphaeriaceae family. The genus contains three species.

References

External links
Fluviatispora at Index Fungorum

Sordariomycetes genera
Microascales